Karumandapam is a part of the city of Tiruchirappalli in Tamil Nadu, India, adjoining the Tiruchirappalli Junction. Situated on the Tiruchi-Dindigul road, Just 3 Km from Trichy Central Bus Stand. Karumandapam has been affected by traffic congestion over the past few years. Karumandapam has its unique Temple Named "Ilangattu mariamman Kovil"(இளங்காட்டு மாரியம்மன் கோவில்). This temple is very old and powerful for the Peoples who lives in and around Karumandapam.Its car festival falls on the Tamil month of "Vaigasi"(வைகாசி) every year. This is Seven days festival Through Sunday to next Monday.

Karumandapam is a self-sufficient neighbourhood which has all amenities like schools and hospitals.

Banks Available in Karumandapam

Statebank of India, Indian Overseas Bank, Karur vysya Bank, TDCC, Manapuram Gold Loan

ATM Availability

ICICI, Statebank of India, Indian Overseas Bank, Karur vysya Bank, Dhanalakshmi Bank, City Union Bank

Medicals Availability

Aravind Medicals, Med Plus, Appolo

Nearby Schools and Colleges

National College, Cheddinadu arts and Science College, Oxford Engineering College, CARE Engineering College, Arockiamatha Matriculation Higher Secondary school, Om Maruthi Matriculation School, Ponnagan English Medium School, 
Govt middle School

Notes 

Neighbourhoods and suburbs of Tiruchirappalli

situated 3 km from trichirappalli junction.